Edmonton-South (previously styled Edmonton South) is a provincial electoral district in Edmonton, Alberta, Canada. The first iteration was used for the 1913 and 1917 provincial elections. The district was re-created again for the 30th Alberta general election.

Geography
The first iteration of Edmonton South included the part of Edmonton south of the North Saskatchewan River, which had recently been amalgamated into Edmonton.

The re-created Edmonton-South has the Whitemud Creek and Rabbit Hill Road as its western boundary, the Henday as its northern boundary (except the area between Rabbit Hill Road and the Whitemud Creek south of 23rd Ave NW), 91st St SW and 88 St SW as its eastern boundary, and extends South to Highway 19 on the west side of the QEII according to the City of Edmonton's plan to annex a portion of Leduc County.

History

Edmonton South was created when the district of Strathcona, centering on the old City of Strathcona, was renamed due to the city's merger with Edmonton.

The incumbent in 1913 was Alexander Rutherford, who had resigned as Premier of Alberta in 1910 but remained a Liberal MLA. He ran for re-election as a private member in the renamed Edmonton South, but was defeated by Conservative Herbert Crawford, a Whyte Avenue merchant. A similar surprise occurred in southside Edmonton in 1989, when sitting premier Don Getty (MLA for Edmonton-Whitemud) was unseated by a Liberal challenger.

Crawford was re-elected in 1917, and served a second term as an opposition MLA. Edmonton South merged with Edmonton West and Edmonton East to form the multi-member Edmonton constituency in 1921, where Crawford was not re-elected, placing ninth.

In 2017, the Electoral Boundaries Commission decided to re-use the name Edmonton-South for a new district, carving it mostly from Edmonton-South West and smaller parts of Edmonton-Whitemud, Edmonton-Ellerslie and Leduc-Beaumont.

Election Results

1910s

|}

|}

2010s

External links
Website of the Legislative Assembly of Alberta

References 

Alberta provincial electoral districts
Politics of Edmonton